ESPN NHL 2K5 is an ice hockey simulation made by ESPN Videogames (now 2K Games) and published on the Xbox and PlayStation 2 consoles. ESPN's Gary Thorne on play-by-play commentary and Bill Clement on color commentary calls all the action. This is also the last NHL Game to be published by Sega, and the last to branded by ESPN.

Gameplay
The game includes an extensive franchise mode where the player can perform many team management functions, including hiring staff, managing player contracts, editing players, scouting new players and sending players back to minor teams for training. It also includes more traditional game modes like season, playoffs, exhibition and shootout. The game manual is also built into the software.

The 2004's edition of the game also introduces an advanced control setting which allows much more flexible control of the player, using the entire control pad rather than only a few buttons.

The North American release of the game features a number of specific game additions, including the ability to play the Heritage Classic, the first time an official outdoor hockey game was represented in a video game.

The cover of ESPN NHL 2K5, features Tampa Bay Lightning's Martin St. Louis. The cover of the Canadian edition surrounds the "NHL 2K5" lettering with a maple leaf.

Controls
The controls in the game allow the player to have full stick control on both offense and defense.  On the offensive side they can control their dekes by moving the right analog stick.  This does a deke in the direction the analog stick was pushed.  Also on offense when they want to deke out a goalie they hold the preset button (ex: for Advance hold L1+O) and move the stick with the left analog stick and then release to shoot. This provides for exciting dekes, but also on offense they can protect the puck from poke-checking defensemen by hold circle and choosing where they want to protect it with the analog stick.  On the other side the defensive stick control allows them to skate backwards and also swing their stick across the ice to hit the puck away from the opposing player.

Reception

The game received "generally favorable reviews" on both platforms according to the review aggregation website Metacritic. It received runner-up placements in GameSpots 2004 "Best Traditional Sports Game" and "Best Budget Game" award categories across all platforms, losing both to ESPN NFL 2K5.

See also
NHL 2K

References

External links

Xbox games
PlayStation 2 games
NHL 2K5
2004 video games
ESPN National Hockey League video games
05
Video games developed in the United States
Video games set in 2004
Video games set in 2005
Multiplayer and single-player video games